Kolodavitsa is a village in Setomaa Parish, Võru County, in southeastern Estonia, on the border with Russia. Tartu–Pechory and Valga–Pechory railways pass Kolodavitsa and cross the border in nearby Koidula village. Currently there's only freight traffic on Tartu–Pechory. Kolodavitsa has a station named "Veski" on the Valga–Pechory line, but it's inactive since 2001. At the moment new Koidula railway station is being built in the neighbouring Matsuri village, this enables the traffic between Tartu–Pechory and Valga–Pechory lines without crossing the Russian border.

Kolodavitsa has a population of 34 (as of 1 January 2011).

References

Villages in Võru County